Filippo Di Stani (born 21 April 1986) is an Italian football defender who plays for S.S. Cavese 1919.

See also
Football in Italy
List of football clubs in Italy

References

External links
http://aic.football.it/scheda/18865/di-stani-filippo.htm

Living people
1986 births
Italian footballers
U.S. Vibonese Calcio players
Association football defenders
A.C. Sangiustese players